Adrabaecampi is the scholarly transliteration into Latin of Ptolemy's Adrabaikampoi, a tribe, he says, of greater Germany, dwelling on the north bank of the Danube south of the Gabreta Forest after the Marcomanni and Sudini.

Early Germanic peoples